Hélder Bafodé Baldé (born 3 August 1998) is a Portuguese professional footballer who plays as a defender for Italian  club Messina. Born in Bissau, he represents Portugal at international youth level.

Club career
On 26 January 2023, Baldé signed with Messina in Italian third-tier Serie C.

References

External links
 
 
 

1998 births
Living people
Sportspeople from Bissau
Portuguese footballers
Portugal youth international footballers
Bissau-Guinean footballers
Bissau-Guinean emigrants to Portugal
Association football defenders
U.D. Leiria players
C.F. Os Belenenses players
Casa Pia A.C. players
S.L. Benfica B players
C.D. Aves players
FC Lugano players
A.C.R. Messina players
Liga Portugal 2 players
Primeira Liga players
Swiss 1. Liga (football) players
Portuguese expatriate footballers
Portuguese expatriate sportspeople in Switzerland
Bissau-Guinean expatriate footballers
Bissau-Guinean expatriate sportspeople in Switzerland
Expatriate footballers in Switzerland
Portuguese expatriate sportspeople in Italy
Bissau-Guinean expatriate sportspeople in Italy
Expatriate footballers in Italy